Alvah Edson Bowman (January 25, 1893 – October 11, 1979), nicknamed "Abe", was an American professional baseball right-handed pitcher, who played as a swingman in Major League Baseball (MLB) for the Cleveland Naps/Indians, from  to .

Baseball career

Minor league career
(At times, Bowman served as a player-manager.)

Major league career
In Bowman's second year of professional baseball, he was purchased by the MLB Cleveland "Naps" from the Grand Rapids Bill-eds of the Central League, on August 7, 1913. (However, Bowman did not pitch in the major leagues, that season.)

Bowman made his big league debut on May 19, 1914, in a no-decision against the Washington Senators, in Washington — pitching three scoreless innings — in relief of Willie Mitchell. Although Bowman pitched in 22 games for Cleveland in 1914, his role was more limited in 1915. He played the remainder of his baseball career in the minor leagues, last pitching in the 1933 season.

Death
Bowman died at the age of 86, on October 11, 1979, in Longview, Texas.

References

External links

1893 births
1979 deaths
Cleveland Naps players
Cleveland Indians players
Major League Baseball pitchers
Baseball players from Illinois
Minor league baseball managers
Muskegon Speeders players
Grand Rapids Bill-eds players
Cleveland Bearcats players
Cleveland Spiders (minor league) players
Toledo Iron Men players
South Bend Benders players
Wichita Jobbers players
Seattle Rainiers players
Wichita Falls Spudders players
Nashville Vols players
Tyler Trojans players
Sulphur Springs Saints players
Sulphur Springs Spartans players
Mt. Pleasant Cats players
Longview Cannibals players
Marshall Indians players
Mexia Gushers players
Paris Colts players
Paris Rustlers players
People from Greenup, Illinois